Clytra aliena is a species of leaf beetles from the subfamily Cryptocephalinae, that is native to Turkey.

References

Beetles described in 1897
Beetles of Asia
Clytrini
Endemic fauna of Turkey
Taxa named by Julius Weise